William Henry Paine Hatch (August 2, 1875 – November 11, 1972) was an American theologian and New Testament scholar.

Early life and education 
Hatch was born in Camden, New Jersey. He attended Harvard University, graduating in 1898 (Ph.D., 1904). Afterward, he graduated the Episcopal Theological School in Cambridge, Massachusetts, and the General Theological Seminary in New York City. Hatch earned a Doctor of Divinity from Union Theological Seminary in New York and a Doctor of Theology from the University of Strasbourg.

Career 
Hatch was ordained to the Episcopal priesthood in 1902. He was Professor of the Literature and Interpretation of the New Testament at the Episcopal Theological School in Cambridge, Massachusetts. Hatch published many articles and reviews and was the author of The Pauline Idea of Faith (1917), and, with C. C. Edmunds, The Gospel Manuscripts of the General Theological Seminary (1918).

Works

Thesis

Books

References

1875 births
1972 deaths
Writers from Camden, New Jersey
American Episcopal theologians
Harvard University alumni
American biblical scholars
New Testament scholars
Textual scholarship
Anglican biblical scholars